NRK P3 is a nationwide digital radio channel operated by the Norwegian Broadcasting Corporation (NRK). It was established as NRK's third radio channel in 1993, and was the result of the NRK radio channel reform initiated in 1992 by radio director Tor Fuglevik.

NRK P3 focuses on youth culture: principally music, together with humour, entertainment, and health education.

Over the years NRK P3 has fostered entertainers including Thomas Numme, Steinar Sagen, Kristopher Schau, Kari Slaatsveen, Jørgen Strickert, Anne Lindmo and Espen Thoresen.

All NRK's radio stations are gradually digitized during 2017 and transmitted via DAB+ and internet only.

Its notable programs include P3 Sessions that airs own-produced concerts live. Started in 2003, it has an average of 100,000 listeners.

Directors
Rita Westvik (1992–1993)
Tormod Kjensjord (1993–1997)
Nils Heldal (1997–2001)
Marius Lillelien (2001–2009)
Tone Donald (2009–2016)
Bjørn Tore Grøtte (acting, 2016–2017)
Camilla Bjørn (2017–)

NRK mP3
NRK mP3 is the dance music sister station to P3. It is aimed towards younger listeners. On 29 October 2021, the station teamed up with a number of stations in Europe, such as BBC Radio 1 in the UK and RTÉ 2fm in Ireland, to take part in the radio programme Europe's Biggest Dance Show.

References

External links
Official website (in Norwegian)
NRK P3 online radio

NRK
Radio stations in Norway
Radio stations established in 1993
1993 establishments in Norway